Huron University USA in London, also referred to as Huron University, was a private university located on Russell Square, Bloomsbury, London.  The school offered American-style higher education.  The university had over 350 students from more than 50 countries and offered a range of undergraduate and graduate programs in Central London. It is now the London campus of Hult International Business School.

History 
The institution was originally established in 1989 as a branch of Huron University, an American university based in Huron, South Dakota, that was founded in 1883.  The school became independent and unaffiliated with the American school in the 1990s, and the parent school in the United States closed in 2005.  The campus moved to its current location in Bloomsbury in January 2004.

Huron University London was accredited in the US, through the New England Association of Schools and Colleges (NEASC), in association with Hult International Business School in Boston, Massachusetts, and in the UK with the British Accreditation Council (BAC).

The primary undergraduate degrees offered were:
Business
International Relations
Communications

Joint Majors programs were also available for undergraduates and a master's degree (MA) in International Relations was offered. Students could apply for scholarships on a merit or need-based system. Applicants with IB, AP, A levels and some other academic qualifications were entitled to advanced placement on degree programs.

With a diverse and international student body representing over 60 nationalities, and a dedicated internship program, the university aimed to focus on a globally minded curriculum. Speaker series, seminars and alumni events were conducted regularly to link students with an international network of expertise. Small classes of 20 students or less ensured a personal service from faculty and staff. Students at Huron benefited from access to the student union services at the University of London and the libraries at Senate House and the School of Oriental and African Studies (SOAS).

The university's private halls of residence were located a five-minute walk away, at nearby Byng Place, Bloomsbury.

Hult
Huron University USA in London merged with Hult International Business School in December 2007, creating a global university with campuses in Boston, London, Dubai and Shanghai. Huron's Bloomsbury campus subsequently became Hult's London postgraduate campus.

External links
 Hult International Business School
 British Accreditation Council website

Educational institutions established in 1989
Defunct universities and colleges in London
Private universities in the United Kingdom
1989 establishments in England